Johan M. Klehs is a California state politician from San Leandro. He was born in Alameda, California on June 27, 1952. He is a Democrat. Klehs served as a member of the San Leandro, California City Council from 1978 to 1982. He represented California's 14th Assembly District from 1982 until 1992 and the 18th District from 1992 to 1994. He served as a member of the State Board of Equalization from 1994 until 2002 when he was termed out and lost the Democratic primary for State Controller. He served in the Assembly again from 2004 to 2006, representing the 18th District.

Klehs served as a lecturer of political science and strategic advisor to the Chancellor of the University of California, Berkeley.

Elected offices

References

External links
UC Berkeley Biography

1952 births
Living people
Politicians from Alameda, California
Democratic Party members of the California State Assembly
21st-century American politicians
20th-century American politicians
Candidates in the 2002 United States elections
People from San Leandro, California
University of California, Berkeley faculty